Friden Calculating Machine Company (Friden, Inc.) was an American manufacturer of typewriters and mechanical, later electronic calculators. It was founded by Carl Friden in San Leandro, California, in 1934.

History

In 1957, Friden purchased the Commercial Controls Corporation of Rochester, New York. This gave them the Flexowriter teleprinter, an electric typewriter capable of being used as part of unit record equipment developed in World War II for the Department of the Navy to automatically type "regret to inform you" letters to the survivors of fallen servicemen, the predecessor to modern computers. The Flexowriter could be attached to Friden calculators and driven by paper tape to produce bills and other form letters which had names of customers and amounts of bills filled in automatically. Friden eventually expanded into production of a few models of early transistorized computers.

Friden introduced the first fully transistorized desktop electronic calculator, the model EC-130 in June 1963, designed by Robert "Bob" Appleby Ragen. This machine had a 13-digit capacity and a 5-inch CRT display. It used a magnetostrictive delay-line memory, to save money on expensive transistors. The EC-130 sold for $2,200, or about three times the price of comparable electromechanical calculators of the time. It was the first calculator to use reverse Polish notation (RPN), which eliminated the need for parentheses to specify the order of operations in complex calculations. The successor model EC-132, introduced in April 1965, added a square root function.

In 1965 the company was purchased by the Singer Corporation, but continued operation under the Friden brand name until 1974.

The Singer – Friden Research Center in Oakland, California, later moved to Palo Alto, California (1965 to 1970), was unable to develop a pocket-sized calculator to compete with the corresponding new Japanese products, such as the Busicom, based on Intel 4004 in 1971, Casio Mini and Sharp EL-805 in 1972.

References

Further reading

External links

Friden tribute web site (archived 2019)
Friden STW-10 Electromechanical calculator sold from 1949 to 1966
Friden Flexowriter combination typewriter and paper tape punch, designed by IBM during the 1940s and bought out by Friden in the late 1950s (Retrieved April 10, 2007)
Friden EC-130 Electronic calculator (1963)
Friden EC-132 Electronic calculator (1965)
Singer/Friden 1152 Electronic printing calculator with DTL logic
Singer/Friden 1162 Electronic calculator with DTL logic and CRT display
Friden/Singer 1112 with 507 transistors and twelve digit Nixie tube display, designed and built by Hitachi

Mechanical calculator companies
Electromechanical calculator companies
Electronic calculator companies
Companies based in San Leandro, California
Manufacturing companies disestablished in 1974
Manufacturing companies established in 1934
1934 establishments in California
1974 disestablishments in California
American companies disestablished in 1974